Steve Larouche (born April 14, 1971) is a Canadian former professional ice hockey player. Larouche played two seasons in the National Hockey League (NHL) split between the Ottawa Senators, New York Rangers, and Los Angeles Kings from 1994–1996.

Playing career
Larouche was drafted 41st overall by the Montreal Canadiens in the 1989 NHL Entry Draft. He was a standout scorer in junior, playing for the Trois-Rivières Draveurs of the Quebec Major Junior Hockey League, scoring 153 and 145 points in the 1988–89 and 1989–90 seasons, respectively. In 1990–91, now with the Chicoutimi Saguenéens, he led the team to the Memorial Cup by leading the QMJHL in playoff goals, assists, and points.

The next season, Larouche advanced to the American Hockey League to play for the Fredericton Canadiens. However, after two solid seasons with the club, he never got called up to the NHL and he played the 1993–94 season for the Atlanta Knights of the International Hockey League, and continued his scoring success by scoring 96 points in the regular season, and leading the IHL in playoff goals and points in the playoffs as the Knights won the Turner Cup.

Larouche was signed by the Ottawa Senators in the fall of that year, but because of the 1994–95 NHL lockout he found himself back down in the AHL with the P.E.I. Senators. Nevertheless, he led the league in goals with 53 in only 70 games, and finally got a chance with the Senators late in the season. He did not disappoint, scoring eight goals and fifteen points in only eighteen games. However, before the next season started, he was traded to the New York Rangers for Jean-Yves Roy, and then later on to the Los Angeles Kings for Chris Snell. He was back in the minors permanently by the end of the season, and he continued on in the IHL, scoring at a prolific pace until the league disbanded in 2001. After this he went on to play hockey in Germany, Finland and Switzerland.

Awards
QMJHL Second All-Star Team (1990)
AHL First All-Star Team (1995)
Awarded Fred Hunt Memorial Trophy for Sportsmanship (1995)
Awarded Les Cunningham Award as League MVP (1995)
IHL First All-Star Team (1997, 2000, 2001)
Won Turner Cup as League Champion (1994, 1998, 2000)

Achievements
Led QMJHL in playoff goals with 13 (1991)
Led QMJHL in playoff assists with 20 (1991)
Led QMJHL in playoff points with 33 (1991)
Led IHL in playoff goals with 16 (1994)
Led IHL in playoff points with 26 (1994)
Led AHL in regular season goals with 53 (1994–95)
Led IHL in regular season assists with 57 (1999–00)

Career statistics

External links

1971 births
Living people
Atlanta Knights players
EHC Basel players
Binghamton Rangers players
Canadian ice hockey centres
Chicago Wolves (IHL) players
Chicoutimi Saguenéens (QMJHL) players
Eisbären Berlin players
Fredericton Canadiens players
Sportspeople from Rouyn-Noranda
SC Langenthal players
Los Angeles Kings players
Lukko players
Canadian expatriate ice hockey players in Finland
Montreal Canadiens draft picks
New York Rangers players
Nürnberg Ice Tigers players
Ottawa Senators players
Phoenix Roadrunners (IHL) players
Pont Rouge Lois Jeans players
Prince Edward Island Senators players
Quebec Rafales players
HC Sierre players
Trois-Rivières Draveurs players
Ice hockey people from Quebec
Canadian expatriate ice hockey players in Germany